Jason Gillane (born 24 March 2000) is an Irish hurler who plays for Limerick Senior Championship club Patrickswell and at inter-county level with the  Limerick senior hurling team. A forward for his club, he usually lines out as a goalkeeper in inter-county competitions. His brother, Aaron Gillane, also plays for Patrickswell and Limerick.

Career statistics

Honours

Ardscoil Rís
Dr. Harty Cup (1): 2018

Patrickswell
Limerick Senior Hurling Championship (1): 2019

Limerick
All-Ireland Senior Hurling Championship (1): 2020
Munster Senior Hurling Championship (1): 2020
National Hurling League (1): 2020
Munster Senior Hurling League (1): 2020

References

2000 births
Living people
Patrickswell hurlers
Limerick inter-county hurlers
Hurling goalkeepers